Roland Mqwebu (16 January 1941 – 28 August 2015) was a South African actor famous for his role as James Mkhize, an InDuna and mantshingelani (watchman) in the sitcom Emzini Wezinsizwa.

Early life

Mqwebu was born on January 16, 1941, in Inanda as the third of 13 children. He grew up in a Christian family with actors and singers. He learned how to play the piano and started to record his own songs. He performed as a backup singer for Phuzekhemisi.

Actor

Some of Mqwebu's most notable early films were Diamante sir Gefahrlich (1965),  uDeliwe (1976) and Shaka Zulu (1986). For Shaka Zulu, he was the assistant director and played the role of Ngomane kaMqoboli, Shaka's friend and the commander of the Mthethwa clan. He is best known for his role as Mkhize, an induna and security guard living in Room 8 of a hostel with Jerry Phele (Thabang Mofokeng), Jabulani Nkosi (Benson Chirwali), Vusi Thanda (Moses Tshawe) and Shadrack Ngema (inyanga uMagubane).

Personal life

Mqwebu lived in Belleview Gardens in Durban, South Africa. He married Pinky Mqwebu, a former teacher, and they had four children. One, Lawrencia, works as a content producer on Ukhozi FM.

Death

Mqwebu died of kidney failure on 28 August 2015, at the age of 74 at Ethekwini Heart Hospital and Heart Centre.

References 

1941 births
2015 deaths
South African male film actors
South African male television actors